Mladen Križanović  (born 24 September 1977) is a retired Croatian footballer.

References

External links

Profile at 1hnl.net

1977 births
Living people
Sportspeople from Vinkovci
Association football defenders
Croatian footballers
HNK Cibalia players
NK Hrvatski Dragovoljac players
NK Široki Brijeg players
HNK Vukovar '91 players
Croatian Football League players
First Football League (Croatia) players
Premier League of Bosnia and Herzegovina players
Croatian expatriate footballers
Expatriate footballers in Bosnia and Herzegovina
Croatian expatriate sportspeople in Bosnia and Herzegovina